Microtubule-associated protein 2 is a protein in humans that is encoded by the MAP2 gene.

Function 

This gene encodes a protein that belongs to the microtubule-associated protein family. The proteins of this family were originally isolated since they copurify with tubulin in polymerization experiments: tubulin in cell extracts can be made to polymerize to produce microtubules (MT) under the influence of heat and the addition of GTP, and the MT can then be collected by centrifugation. When this is done a series of microtubule associated proteins are collected along with the MT and can be detected by SDS-PAGE and other methods. Brain extracts are rich in several of these proteins, MAP2 being one of these. The single MAP2 gene produces four major transcripts producing four proteins, MAP2A, MAP2B, MAP2C and MAP2D. MAP2A and MAP2B are very high molecular weight proteins, with apparent molecular weight on SDS-PAGE about 250kDa, while MAP2C and MAP2D are much lower molecular weight forms with apparent SDS-PAGE size about 70kDa. All forms of MAP2 share a common core sequence which includes MT binding domains, 18 amino acid sequences which are found in other MT associated proteins such as MAP Tau and MAP1B. The MAP2 isoforms are thought to be involved in MT assembly, which is an essential step in neuritogenesis. MAP2 serves to stabilize MT growth by crosslinking MT with intermediate filaments and other MTs.  MAP2 isoforms are neuron-specific cytoskeletal proteins enriched in dendrites and perikarya, implicating a role in determining and stabilizing neuronal morphology during neuron development. As a result antibodies to MAP2 are widely used to identify neuronal cells and trace dendritic processes in experimental contexts.

Interactions 

MAP2 has been shown to interact with Grb2, NEFL and MYO7A., All MAP2 isoforms bind to microtubules.

References

Further reading